Stigmella gimmonella is a moth of the family Nepticulidae. It is only known from Hokkaido in Japan.

Adults are on wing from July to August and from May to June. There are probably two generations per year.

The larvae feed on Ulmus laciniata and Ulmus davidiana var. japonica. They mine the leaves of their host plant. The mine consists of a linear, thin gallery, which sometimes partly follows the leafmargin or a vein. The first one third of the mine is filled with frass occupying about the thirds of the width of the gallery and leaving very thin clear margins. The frass in the second one third of the mine is linear (similarly to the preceding) but a little broader, occupying the central part of the track up to half the width. In the remaining one third of the mine, the frass becomes sparse and is arranged in a line, which is narrower than the preceding in most mines. In a few mines, the frass is very thin and linear throughout its length.

External links
Japanese Species Of The Genus Stigmella (Nepticulidae: Lepidoptera)

Nepticulidae
Moths of Japan
Moths described in 1931
Taxa named by Shōnen Matsumura